Márió Zeke (born 1 September 2000) is a Hungarian football defender who plays for OTP Bank Liga club Kecskemét on loan from Fehérvár.

Club career
Zeke joined Kecskemét on loan for the 2022–23 season.

Career statistics
As of 19 December 2022

References

External links
 
 

2000 births
People from Sopron
Sportspeople from Győr-Moson-Sopron County
Living people
Hungarian footballers
Hungary youth international footballers
Association football defenders
Győri ETO FC players
Fehérvár FC players
Gyirmót FC Győr players
Budaörsi SC footballers
Budafoki LC footballers
Kecskeméti TE players
Nemzeti Bajnokság I players
Nemzeti Bajnokság II players